Ozerki may refer to:
Ozerki (rural locality) (Ozyorki), several rural localities in Russia
Ozerki railway station, a railway station in north of Saint Petersburg
Ozerki (Saint Petersburg Metro), a station of the Saint Petersburg Metro
Ozerki (Historic district in Saint Petersburg), a historic district in Saint Petersburg